Plesio is a comune (municipality) in the Province of Como in the Italian region Lombardy, located about  north of Milan and about  northeast of Como.

Plesio borders the following municipalities: Cremia, Garzeno, Grandola ed Uniti, Menaggio, San Siro.

Demographic evolution

References

Cities and towns in Lombardy